Madrasa Bir Lahjar is one of the madrasahs of the Medina of Tunis.

Location 

It is located in 40 El Pacha Street.

History 
Abu l-Hasan Ali I the Husainid Bey built four madrasas during his reign including the madrasa El Bachia in 1752 and the madrasa El Achouria in 1756. In the same year, he commanded that the Madrasa Bir Lahjar should be built.

The construction works finished a year later in 1757 after the death of the bey.

The madrasa hosted for decades Malikite students coming from different regions in the country.

Habous 
Thanks to Abu l-Hasan Ali I, the madrasa had 25 different financial resources or Habous like 5 Foundouks, 3 shops, 1 house, etc.

Architecture 

The entrance has a beautiful marble plating.

On the right of the door, the madrasa has a sabil decorated with a window and a marble plaque in which some information about the madrasa's foundation is inscribed.

It has 16 rooms for the students and a prayer room.

References 

Madrasas in the medina of Tunis